Wapello County is a county located in the U.S. state of Iowa. As of the 2020 census, the population was 35,437. The county seat is Ottumwa. The county was formed on February 17, 1843, and named for Wapello, a Meskwaki chief.

Wapello County is included in the Ottumwa, IA Micropolitan Statistical Area.

Geography

Major highways
 U.S. Highway 34
 U.S. Highway 63
 Iowa Highway 16
 Iowa Highway 137
 Iowa Highway 149

Transit
 Ottumwa station
 Ottumwa Transit Authority
 List of intercity bus stops in Iowa

Adjacent counties
Mahaska County  (northwest)
Keokuk County  (northeast)
Jefferson County  (east)
Davis County  (south)
Monroe County  (west)

Demographics

2020 census
There were 15,734 housing units, of which 14,167 were occupied.

2010 census
There were 16,098 housing units, of which 14,552 were occupied.

2000 census

As of the census of 2000, there were 36,051 people, 14,784 households, and 9,801 families residing in the county.  The population density was 84 people per square mile (32/km2).  There were 15,873 housing units at an average density of 37 per square mile (14/km2).  The racial makeup of the county was 96.28% White, 0.93% Black or African American, 0.28% Native American, 0.65% Asian, 0.02% Pacific Islander, 1.05% from other races, and 0.79% from two or more races.  2.22% of the population were Hispanic or Latino of any race.

There were 14,784 households, out of which 28.80% had children under the age of 18 living with them, 52.70% were married couples living together, 9.90% had a female householder with no husband present, and 33.70% were non-families. 28.20% of all households were made up of individuals, and 13.40% had someone living alone who was 65 years of age or older.  The average household size was 2.37 and the average family size was 2.89.

In the county, the population was spread out, with 23.30% under the age of 18, 9.70% from 18 to 24, 26.00% from 25 to 44, 23.30% from 45 to 64, and 17.80% who were 65 years of age or older.  The median age was 39 years. For every 100 females there were 94.80 males.  For every 100 females age 18 and over, there were 91.70 males.

The median income for a household in the county was $32,188, and the median income for a family was $39,224. Males had a median income of $31,346 versus $21,286 for females. The per capita income for the county was $16,500.  About 9.40% of families and 13.20% of the population were below the poverty line, including 18.00% of those under age 18 and 7.90% of those age 65 or over.

Communities

Cities
Agency
Blakesburg
Chillicothe
Eddyville
Eldon
Kirkville
Ottumwa

Unincorporated communities

Ashland
Bladensburg
Dahlonega
Dudley
Farson
Munterville
Phillips
Pickwick
Ottumwa Junction
Rutledge

Townships

Adams
Agency
Cass
Center
Columbia
Competine
Dahlonega
Green
Highland
Keokuk
Pleasant
Polk
Richland
Washington

Population ranking
The population ranking of the following table is based on the 2020 census of Wapello County.

† county seat

Politics

See also

Big 4 Fair Art Hall, located at the Wapello County Fairgrounds
Wapello County Courthouse
National Register of Historic Places listings in Wapello County, Iowa

References

External links

Official Wapello County website

 
Iowa placenames of Native American origin
1843 establishments in Iowa Territory
Populated places established in 1843